Oak Grove School, Jharipani, Mussoorie is a residential public school, owned and run by the Indian Railways. It is situated on hill tops covering  in Jharipani, Mussoorie, India.

The school was started by the British Raj on 1 June 1888. The students predominantly consist of the children of Indian Railways employees; 25% of seats are reserved for outsiders. At present there are more than 610 students. The school consists of three semi-independent parts — Oak Grove Sr. Boys' School (commenced 1888), Oak Grove Sr. Girls' School (1890s) and Oak Grove Junior School (1912). The buildings were designed by the chief engineer of EIR Mr. Richard Roskell Bayne and are built in Gothic style of architecture. LBSNAA ( Lal Bahadur Shashtri National Academy of Administration) conducted its sports day several times in the valley of Oak Grove School.

Administration 
The overall functioning of the school is under the control of a Board of Governors, which frames and reviews policies to ensure smooth and efficient functioning of the institution during its annual meetings. The BOG consists of:

Chairman - General Manager, Northern Railway

Executive Governor - The Chief Personnel Officer, Northern Railway

Member - The Chief Engineer, Northern Railway

Member - The F.A. & C.A.O., Northern Railway

Member - The C.M.D., Northern Railway

Member - The S.D.G.M., Northern Railway

Member - The D.R.M., Northern Railway, Moradabad

Secretary - Principal, Oak Grove School

Principals' Timeline

Oakgrovians at the Olympic games 
Several Oak Grove students represented pre-independence India (under the British Raj) in field hockey at the Olympics between 1928 Amsterdam to 1936 Berlin Olympics, winning Gold medal each time. These  were:

Amsterdam Olympics – 1928

 Richard James Allen + - # Goalkeeper
 Leslie Charles Hammond
 Broome Eric Pinniger

Los Angeles Olympics – 1932

 Richard James Allen + - # Goalkeeper
 Leslie Charles Hammond
 Broome Eric Pinniger
 Richard Carr

Berlin Olympics – 1936

 Richard James Allen + - # Goalkeeper

References

External links 
 Alumni Corner, http://www.oakgrovian.info/
 Oakgrovians Young & Old, http://www.oakgrovians.com 

Railway schools in India
Schools in Colonial India
High schools and secondary schools in Uttarakhand
Boarding schools in Uttarakhand
Education in Dehradun district
Mussoorie
Educational institutions established in 1888
1888 establishments in India